Nights in Port Said (French: Les nuits de Port Said) is a 1932 French drama film directed by Leo Mittler and starring Renée Héribel, Gustav Diessl and Oskar Homolka. It was shot at the Joinville Studios in Paris. The film's sets were designed by the art director Alfred Junge. It was produced and distributed by the French subsidiary of Paramount Pictures.

Cast
 Renée Héribel as Charlotte  
 Gustav Diessl as Le matelot Hans  
 Oskar Homolka as Winston Winkler  
 Marcel Vallée as L'oncle  
 Leonard Steckel as Le levantin  
 Jean Worms as Le tenancier de l'agence 
 José Davert 
 Philiberte Lokay
 Armand Lurville 
 Ricardo Núñez 
 Nadia Sibirskaïa

References

Bibliography 
 Waldman, Harry & Slide, Anthony. Hollywood and the Foreign Touch: A Dictionary of Foreign Filmmakers and Their Films from America, 1910-1995. Scarecrow Press, 1996.

External links 
 

1932 films
French drama films
1932 drama films
1930s French-language films
Films directed by Leo Mittler
Paramount Pictures films
Films shot at Joinville Studios
French black-and-white films
1930s French films